Messina Marittima railway station is an interchange station for train and ferry services into and out of the city and comune of Messina, on the island of Sicily, Italy.  Opened in 1889 and was rebuilt between 1937 and 1939. It forms part of the Palermo–Messina and Messina–Syracuse railways.

The station is currently managed by Rete Ferroviaria Italiana (RFI).  However, the commercial area of the passenger building is managed by Centostazioni.  Train services to and from the station are operated by Trenitalia, and the connecting ferry services are operated by Bluvia.  Each of these companies is a subsidiary of Ferrovie dello Stato (FS), Italy's state-owned rail company.

Location
Messina Marittima railway station is adjacent to Messina Centrale railway station, which is in Piazza della Repubblica, southeast of the city centre.

History

The delay in making this connection was due to financial difficulties affecting the Società Vittorio Emanuele, which was taken over by the Società per le strade ferrate della Sicilia (better known as la Sicula) in 1885.

Both stations were severely damaged in the Messina earthquake of 1908 and later reconstructed.

A new station, incorporating both Messina Centrale and Messina Marittima, was built between 1937 and 1939 to replace the two old stations.  Designed by the architect Angiolo Mazzoni, the two part passenger building is an example of rationalist architecture, with large spaces and imposing linear elements.

Features

Passenger building

Overview
The passenger building is shaped like an arch lying on its side.  The western end faces the road and the west pier of the port; the building then extends as a curved structure over the station yard above the platforms.

The south side of the building is attached and merged with Messina Centrale's passenger building.

The building's two levels are connected by escalators and pedestrian stairways; on the ground floor, there are a ticket office, bars, newsagents and services.

Architecture
The passenger building is a typically impressive fascist design, not lacking in pomposity. Conceived by Mazzoni, its style, incorporating large spaces in a straightforward structure that emphasises the vertical, became the norm for public buildings of the era. Its design makes extensive use of travertine tiling and floor-to-ceiling windows.

Salon of Mosaics

The north side of the passenger building extends parallel to the waterfront, as a long panoramic enclosed bridge crossing the group of tracks leading to the ferry berths.

The hall, or salon, from which the ferries' docking and boarding operations can be seen, is decorated with a magnificent mosaic in vitrified tiles depicting historical, social and environmental themes borrowed from the Sicilian tradition.
 
From openings in the salon at intervals corresponding to the individual berths, long covered gangways extend downwards to give access to passenger ferries.

The final design of the great mosaic was the work of notable Italian artist Michele Cascella. Its subject was inspired by a Mussolini speech to Palermo that "raised" Sicily to "the burden of being the Centre of the Empire".

Execution of the work, based on the painted study, was commissioned by the Opificio delle pietre dure from the Scuola del Mosaico of the Reverenda Fabbrica di San Pietro.

Station yard
The station yard consists of six tracks used by both passenger and freight services.  From the waterfront, these tracks run past two sets of sidings, one on each side, and then fan out into ten tracks extending to the adjoining Messina Centrale station.

Interchange
Messina Marittima offers interchange with ferries to Villa San Giovanni and Reggio Calabria.

Piazza della Repubblica, outside the main entrance to Messina Centrale, is a stop on the Messina tramway.

See also

History of rail transport in Italy
List of railway stations in Sicily
Rail transport in Italy
Railway stations in Italy

References

External links

Messina Marittima railway station on Wikimapia

This article is based upon a translation of the Italian language version as at September 2012.

Marittima Railway Station
Railway stations in Sicily
Railway stations opened in 1889
1889 establishments in Italy
Railway stations in Italy opened in the 19th century